Texadina barretti is a species of very small aquatic snail, an operculate gastropod mollusk in the family Cochliopidae.

Distribution
This marine species occurs in the Gulf of Mexico..

Description 
The maximum recorded shell length is 3.7 mm.

Habitat 
Minimum recorded depth is 0 m. Maximum recorded depth is 2.4 m.

References

 Rosenberg, G., F. Moretzsohn, and E. F. García. 2009. Gastropoda (Mollusca) of the Gulf of Mexico, Pp. 579–699 in Felder, D.L. and D.K. Camp (eds.), Gulf of Mexico–Origins, Waters, and Biota. Biodiversity. Texas A&M Press, College Station, Texas

External links

Cochliopidae
Gastropods described in 1965